Patriarch Anthony or Patriarch Antony may refer to:

 Anthony I of Constantinople, Ecumenical Patriarch in 821–837
 Anthony II of Constantinople, Ecumenical Patriarch in 893–901
 Anthony III of Constantinople, Ecumenical Patriarch in 974–979
 Anthony I, Serbian Patriarch, Archbishop of Peć and Serbian Patriarch in 1571–1574
 Anthony II Peter Arida, Maronite Patriarch in 1932–1955
 Anthony III Peter Khoraish, Maronite Patriarch of Antioch and the Whole Levant in 1975–1986
 Anthony I, Eritrean Patriarch, Archbishop of Asmara and Eritrean Patriarch in 2004–2007

See also 
 Patriarch (disambiguation)
 Anthony (disambiguation)
 Anthony (given name)